Leon Mobley (born February 27, 1961) is a percussionist and drummer, founder and artistic and musical director of Da Lion and Djimbe West African Drummers and Dancers, actor, and a member of the Innocent Criminals, Ben Harper's band. He worked with Damian Marley and Nas on a collaborative album titled Distant Relatives (2010). Leon Mobley began as a child actor on PBS Television show Zoom (1973), and has toured the globe as drummer/percussionist with Ben Harper and the Innocent Criminals (1993–present).

Mobley began playing African drums in 1967, studying for 10 years under the tutelage of Nigerian master drummer Babatunde Olatunji at the Elma Lewis School of Fine Arts in Boston, Massachusetts. In 1977 Mobley studied under the directorship of Senegalese master drummer Ibrahim Camara (former drummer for the National Ballet of Senegal) while a member of the Bokan-Deye Dance Company. Mobley was invited to South Africa in 1991 to perform with returning exiles Letta Mbulu, Caiphus Semenya, and Hugh Masekela.

Mobley studied and performed from 1979 to 1981 in Surinam, South America, Trinidad & Tobago, and throughout the West Indies. He continued his studies in 1982 in Senegal and Gambia. In 1987 and 1992 he traveled to Japan, where he taught and performed West African Drumming and Dancing. While in Japan he visited Sado Island, home of Kodo, the percussion group, in a cultural exchange program. He has also performed and lectured throughout the US and toured Germany, Italy, and Israel producing, recording, conducting clinics, and performing with his group Da Lion. 

Like his mentor Olatunji (who played for many years with Santana and other artists of the day), Mobley has succeeded in bringing African drumming into contemporary mainstream music and has performed and recorded with many major artists in all genres. Among the many artists Mobley has worked with are: Dave Matthews Band, Jack Johnson, Peter Wolf, Mick Jagger, Quincy Jones, Santana, Michael Jackson, Macy Gray, Trevor Hall, Dirty Dozen Brass Band, Blind Boys of Alabama, Damian Marley, Jason Mraz, Madonna, The Fugees, Stevie Wonder, Gov't Mule, Michael Franti & Spearhead, Tom Morello of Rage Against the Machine, Timoria, Airto and Flora Purim, and more. Mobley performed for a Gucci sponsored event at the United Nations which raised $5.5 million for UNICEF and Madonna's charity Raising Malawi.

Mobley has been a signature series artist with Remo who has manufactured and marketed the Leon Mobley custom-designed African drums since 1983. While in Boston he taught at community centers, conducted school tours with the Art of Black Dance and Music, and conducted workshops at Berklee College of Music. He also served as musical director at Paige Academy, a private school in Roxbury, Massachusetts. Mobley continued teaching after moving to Los Angeles in 1986, conducting weekly classes at UCLA, Los Angeles Contemporary Dance Theater, Parks and Recreation, and the Los Angeles High School for the Arts on the campus of Cal State (Los Angeles).

Mobley is the founder and artistic and musical director of Da Lion and Djimbe West African Drummers and Dancers. He founded these two groups in order to help preserve African cultures, and present authentic traditional West African-American dance and music to North American audiences. Through these groups, Mobley educates others about the West African people, their customs, history, and cultural arts, and the influence of traditional African drumming and music on African American art and culture.

References

External links

1961 births
American drummers
American percussionists
Living people
Place of birth missing (living people)